Diocese of Ferns can refer to:
The Roman Catholic Diocese of Ferns
The former Church of Ireland diocese of Ferns, now within the Diocese of Cashel and Ossory

See also
The Bishop of Ferns, a Roman Catholic bishop in Ireland
The Bishop of Ferns and Leighlin, a former Episcopalisan bishop in Ireland